Bruno "Madero" Gavazzoli is a former Italian racing driver. He entered 25 races (22 started) between 1954 and 1960 in an O.S.C.A., a Maserati and two types of Ferraris. He scored one victory.

Complete results

References
 RacingSportsCars.com - "Madero"
 RacingSportsCars.com - Bruno Gavazzoli
 barchetta.cc - Scuderia Ferrari
 barchetta.cc - Bruno Gavazzoli
 barchetta.cc - Supercortemaggiore
 mitorosso.com
 targaflorio.info
 classicscars.com

Year of birth unknown
Italian racing drivers
Mille Miglia drivers